WJAK (1460 AM) is a radio station  broadcasting an Urban contemporary format. It is licensed to Jackson, Tennessee, United States.  The station is currently owned by Thomas Media.

History
The station was assigned the call letters WHMO on May 15, 1991.  On June 14, 1991, the station changed its call sign to WQCR, and on May 17, 1996 to the current WJAK.

References

External links

JAK
Urban contemporary radio stations in the United States
Radio stations established in 1954
1954 establishments in Tennessee